Addax, or Barwa Addax was a Spanish motorsport team owned by the bank Addax Capital, which competed in the GP2, GP3 and GP2 Asia Series.

Team history

GP2 Series

Barwa Addax was formed as a result of Alejandro Agag purchase of the Campos Racing GP2 team.  Campos Racing was started by former Formula One driver Adrián Campos in 1998, and competed in the GP2 Series since its inaugural season in 2005. After the 2008 season, in which Campos won the teams' championship, he elected to step down and pass control of the GP2 team to Agag, a businessman with motorsport interests. Campos Racing continues to compete in the European F3 Open Championship, and in  they entered Formula One as Campos Meta 1 before being taken over and renamed Hispania Racing. Agag renamed the team Addax after the eponymous species of antelope, and retained the name of team sponsor Barwa International, a Qatari real estate company, for the 2009 season.

Addax signed 2008 GP2 Asia Series season champion Romain Grosjean and existing Campos driver Vitaly Petrov for its 2009 campaign. Grosjean took the team's first pole position during the opening qualifying session of the season, in Barcelona. He also took the team's first win, leading home Petrov in a 1–2 finish. Both drivers quickly established themselves as championship contenders.

Following Nelson Piquet Jr.'s departure from the Renault F1 team, Grosjean, who was the team's third driver, was drafted in to replace him from the 2009 European Grand Prix onwards. Grosjean's seat was taken by Durango driver Davide Valsecchi. Despite his absence from the final eight races of the season, Grosjean finished fourth in the championship with two wins, a tally matched by Petrov, who was Nico Hülkenberg's main rival for the championship and eventually finished runner-up. Addax had the consolation of winning the teams' championship in the first season competing with its new name.

For the 2010 season, Petrov graduated to Formula One, also with Renault, and Valsecchi moved to the iSport International team, so Addax signed second-year drivers Giedo van der Garde and Sergio Pérez. Pérez quickly assumed the role of team leader, winning five races and establishing himself as eventual champion Pastor Maldonado's main rival, whilst Van der Garde finished seventh overall with three podium finishes. Addax was narrowly beaten to the teams' championship by Rapax, which scored five more points.

Van der Garde remained with the team for the 2011 season, and the F1-bound Pérez was replaced by Charles Pic, now also in his second year in GP2. Although he did not win a race, Van der Garde scored a consistent string of podium finishes in the first half of the season which established him in second place in the championship behind runaway leader Grosjean, now back in the series and driving for DAMS. However, he slipped back to fifth in the standings after a poor end to the season and was pipped by Pic, who impressed with three pole positions and two race victories. Despite finishing fourth and fifth in the drivers' standings, Addax won its second teams' championship by virtue of the fact that the top three—Grosjean, Luca Filippi and Jules Bianchi—had all been partnered with teammates who scored much fewer points by comparison.

For the 2012 season, Pic graduated to F1 with Marussia and Van der Garde moved to the Caterham Racing team as part of his deal to become the Caterham F1 team's reserve driver; Addax signed the unfancied pairing of Johnny Cecotto Jr. and Josef Král to replace them. Having previously scored a meagre four points over more than two years of GP2, Cecotto made a breakthrough with Addax, winning the feature races at Monaco (from pole position) and Hockenheim. However, his inconsistency limited him to ninth overall in the drivers' championship. On the other side of the garage, Král was replaced by HRT F1 third driver Dani Clos for four races after the first round of the championship, and then endured a run of twelve races without scoring, before taking his own first series victory in the sprint race at Monza. He was then replaced for the final two races of the championship by rookie Jake Rosenzweig, who, like Clos before him, failed to score. As a result of this inconsistent season, Addax dropped to eighth place in the teams' standings.

GP2 Asia Series
Addax also took over Campos Racing's entry in the GP2 Asia Series. In the 2008–09 season, Petrov and Pérez finished fifth and seventh respectively in the drivers' standings, with three wins between them, whilst Addax finished third in the teams' standings. For the 2009–10 season, the team ran the drivers it would employ for the main series (Pérez and Van der Garde) at some rounds, but also fielded Max Chilton, Luiz Razia and Rodolfo González at others; the changes restricted the team to tenth in the championship. For the final GP2 Asia season in 2011, Addax reverted to running its main series drivers (Van der Garde and Pic) throughout.  Van der Garde took two podium finishes to finish third overall, but Pic failed to score any points.

GP3 Series
Addax was one of ten teams granted entries for the inaugural GP3 Series championship in 2010. It was one of only two existing GP2 teams to compete in GP3 as well, the other being ART Grand Prix. The team's three drivers were Felipe Guimarães, Pablo Sánchez López and Mirko Bortolotti. None of the three featured strongly, with two podium finishes between them the team's best results, and they finished 16th, 30th and 11th in the championship respectively. Addax finished eighth in the teams' championship.

For the 2011 season, Addax recruited Dominic Storey, Gabriel Chaves and Dean Smith. Chaves was the only driver to complete the season, as Storey was replaced by Tom Dillmann after two rounds of the championship, and Vittorio Ghirelli took Smith's seat for the final round. On this occasion, Smith was the best of the five, scoring two podium finishes and setting a fastest lap to take 12th overall; Chaves was 19th and Storey 37th; Dillman and Ghirelli were 14th and 25th having also competed for other teams. Addax again finished eighth in the teams' championship, but with eight more points than in 2010. Addax elected to withdraw from the GP3 Series following the conclusion of the 2011 season.

Staff (2009)

 Founder                    Adrian Campos-Suñer
 Team Principal & Owner     Alejandro Agag
 Team Manager               Alberto Longo Álvarez de Sotomayor

 Chief Financial Officer    Jose Julio Rosell
 Technical Director         Chrys Murphy
Chief Logistic             Caterina Sarrión
 Press Officer              Antonio Moralejo
 RRPP                       Marta Viscasillas
 Track Engineer     Emilio Lozano
 Track Engineer     Peter Wyss
 Track Engineer     Phillip Gautheron
 Chief Mechanic     Enrique Colomina
 Mechanics:          Vicente Andreu, Daniel Lluch, Miguel Angel Rovira, Javier López & Gustavo Pochetino

Results

GP2 Series

In detail 
(key) (Races in bold indicate pole position) (Races in italics indicate fastest lap)

GP3 Series

In detail 
(key) (Races in bold indicate pole position) (Races in italics indicate fastest lap)

Notes

References

External links
 Official website

Spanish auto racing teams
GP2 Series teams
GP3 Series teams
Auto racing teams established in 2009
2009 establishments in Spain
Auto racing teams disestablished in 2013
2013 disestablishments in Spain